Marjan Pentenga (born 16 March 1964) is a Dutch rower. She competed at the 1988 Summer Olympics and the 1992 Summer Olympics.

References

1964 births
Living people
Dutch female rowers
Olympic rowers of the Netherlands
Rowers at the 1988 Summer Olympics
Rowers at the 1992 Summer Olympics
Sportspeople from Groningen (city)
20th-century Dutch women
21st-century Dutch women